Queirolo is a surname. Notable people with the surname include:

Elisa Queirolo (born 1991), Italian water polo player
Francesco Queirolo (1704–1762), Italian Genoese-born sculptor
José Martínez Queirolo (1931–2008), Ecuadorian playwright and narrator
Santiago Queirolo, Peruvian pisco producer